The 2018 Pan American Judo Championships was held in San José, Costa Rica from 20 to 21 April 2018.

Results

Men's events

Women's events

Mixed event

Medal table
Key

References

External links
 
 2018 Pan American Championships results
 Pan American Judo Confederation

2018
American Championships
International sports competitions hosted by Costa Rica
2018 in Costa Rican sport
Sports competitions in San José, Costa Rica
April 2018 sports events in North America
Qualification tournaments for the 2019 Pan American Games